Saint-François-d'Assise is a municipality in Quebec, Canada.

In addition to Saint-François-d'Assise itself, the municipality also includes the communities of L'Immaculée-Conception, Saint-Jean-de-Matapédia, and Saint-Joseph-de-Matapédia.

Demographics

Population

See also
 List of municipalities in Quebec

References

Incorporated places in Gaspésie–Îles-de-la-Madeleine
Municipalities in Quebec